Null symbol may refer to:

 Null character, U+0000, U+2400 "symbol for null" (␀), a single-character glyph "NUL"
 Null sign (∅), the empty set
 Null (SQL) (ω), a special marker and keyword NULL in SQL
 Empty string (λ, Λ, or ε), in formal language theory

See also
 Null (disambiguation)
 Ø (disambiguation)